Chuck Jordan may refer to:

 Chuck Jordan (automobile designer) (1927–2010), General Motors car designer
 Chuck Jordan (game designer), American video game designer
 Charles Jordan (government official), Armenian architect and government official

See also
 Charles Jordan (disambiguation)